Säntis was the name of a canton of the Helvetic Republic from 1798 to 1803, consisting of the territory of St. Gallen, Appenzell, and Rheintal. Its capital was St. Gallen.

References 

Cantons of the Helvetic Republic
History of the canton of St. Gallen
Appenzell Innerrhoden
Appenzell Ausserrhoden